Harrisia pomanensis is a species of cactus.

Harrisia pomanensis is considered an exotic invasive in Australia.

References

pomanensis
Cacti of North America
Cacti of South America
Flora of the Caribbean
Flora without expected TNC conservation status